The 2008–09 North West Counties Football League season (known as the 2008–09 Vodkat League for sponsorship reasons) was the 27th in the history of the North West Counties Football League, a football competition in England. Teams were divided into two divisions: the Premier and the First. This was a change from previous seasons when the divisions were known as Division One and Division Two respectively.

Premier Division 

The Premier Division featured four new teams:

 AFC Fylde promoted as runners-up of Division Two (renamed from Kirkham & Wesham F.C.)
 Alsager Town relegated from the Northern Premier League Division One South
 Ashton Athletic promoted as third in Division Two
 New Mills promoted as champions of Division Two

League table

Division One 

Division One featured three new teams:

 A.F.C. Liverpool admitted as a new team
 Irlam promoted as 8th in the Manchester League
 Wigan Robin Park promoted as champions of the Manchester League

Two existing teams underwent name changes for this season:

 Blackpool Mechanics changed their name to AFC Blackpool
 Castleton Gabriels changed their name to Rochdale Town

League table

References

External links 
 NWCFL Official Site

North West Counties Football League seasons
9